Sun Guowen (born 30 September 1993 in Dalian, Liaoning) is a Chinese footballer who currently plays as winger or full-back for Dalian Professional in the Chinese Super League.

Club career
Sun started his professional football career in 2011 when he was promoted to Chinese Super League side Dalian Shide. On 6 May 2012, he made his senior debut for Dalian in a 4–1 home victory against Tianjin Teda, coming on as a substitute for James Chamanga in the 87th minute. He made 5 CSL appearances in the 2012 league season.

In 2013, Sun transferred to Dalian Aerbin after Dalian Shide dissolved. On 21 May 2013, he made his debut for Dalian Aerbin in the third round of 2013 Chinese FA Cup, coming on as a substitute for Zhou Tong in the 86th minute.

Sun left Dalian after scoring six goals in 19 appearances in the 2015 China League One season, claiming that his contract with the club had ended. Dalian appealed for an arbitration in January 2016, and sued the court in March 2016. Sun lost the lawsuit on 10 August 2016. He returned to the renamed Dalian Yifang (now Dalian Professional) in December 2016.

Sun scored one goal in 28 appearances as Dalian won the 2017 China League One championship and earned promotion back to the Chinese Super League ahead of the 2018 season.

Career statistics
Statistics accurate as of match played 31 December 2022.

Honours

Club
Dalian Professional
China League One: 2017.

References

External links
 

1993 births
Living people
Chinese footballers
Footballers from Dalian
Dalian Shide F.C. players
Dalian Professional F.C. players
Chinese Super League players
China League One players
Association football midfielders
Footballers at the 2014 Asian Games
Asian Games competitors for China